Araucnephioides is a genus of black flies from Chile. There is only one known species.

Species
A. schlingeri Wygodzinsky & Coscarón, 1973

Literature cited

Simuliidae
Diptera of South America
Chironomoidea genera
Endemic fauna of Chile